Seabasing is a naval capability to conduct selected functions and tasks at sea without reliance on infrastructure ashore.  Seabasing can sustain large military forces during operations at large distances from traditional logistics centers.

See also
 Expeditionary maneuver warfare
Mobile offshore base
Sea-based X-band Radar

Notes

External links
GlobalSecurity.org

Naval installations
Military logistics